Darkness (Italian: Tenebre) is a 1916 Italian silent film directed by Roberto Roberti and starring Lina Simoni.

References

Bibliography
 Abel, Richard. Encyclopedia of Early Cinema. Taylor & Francis, 2005.

External links

1916 films
1910s Italian-language films
Films directed by Roberto Roberti
Italian silent feature films
Italian black-and-white films